Enamul Hossain (born 1981) is the fifth chess player from Bangladesh to become a Grandmaster. No other player from his country has earned the title since he attained it in 2008. He defeated Pavel Eljanov in a two-game match in Chess World Cup 2007, becoming the only Bangladeshi to qualify for the second round of a chess world cup. He also won the Bangladeshi Chess Championship four times.

Early life and career
Enamul Hossain was born in 1981, and grew up in Dhaka. He learned the rules of chess from his father. In 1993, he played his first chess tournament, which raised his interest in the game. His first FIDE rating was 2255, which was published in January 1996. He owned only two chess books (one of them is Bobby Fischer's My 60 Memorable Games) and he studied them multiple times; it was due to the unavailability of chess books in his country. He played his first Bangladeshi Chess Championship in 1995. He received coaching from Michał Krasenkow in the same year, which is also the only formal coaching he has received. He played as a member of the Bangladeshi team in Chess Olympiad for the first time when he was 15 years old.

Hossain won the Bangladeshi championship for the first time in 1997. He earned the International Master (IM) title in 2002. He got his 1st Grandmaster norm in the 35th Chess Olympiad in Bled, Slovenia the same year he became an IM and achieved his 2nd norm in a Grandmaster tournament in Abu Dhabi in 2007. Since he already reached 2500 rating once in October 2006, which is also required for claiming the Grandmaster title, he became the fifth Grandmaster (GM) from Bangladesh when he fulfilled his 3rd norm in the final round of Bangladeshi championship on 4 May 2008. He qualified for participating in Chess World Cup 2007 and became the only Bangladeshi player to qualify for the second round in a world cup. He did so by defeating Pavel Eljanov; although it was the only world cup he was able to qualify for. He reached his peak rating in April 2009 with a value of 2531.

Fide records show that Hossain took part in only four tournaments from December 2009 to September 2012. His rating also gradually decreased from being 2531 in July 2009 to 2404 in July 2021 with occasional increases. Hossain has not done anything unrelated to chess for income. Besides being an active player, he is a chess coach training particularly the young generation.

Achievements
As mentioned before, Hossain earned the highest title in chessthe Grandmaster titlein 2008. He beat Pavel Eljanov (rated 2691 at that time) in a two-game match in the 2007 Chess World Cup, drawing the first and winning the second game. By doing so, he became the only Bangladeshi player to reach the second round of a chess world cup. He finished in 10th place in the Asian Chess Championship in 2007. He won a GM tournament in Vizag, India in 2012 against a field of 17 grandmasters. He won the Bangladeshi Chess Championship four timesin 1997, 2006, 2016 and 2017.

References

External links
 
 
 

1981 births
Living people
Bangladeshi chess players
Chess grandmasters
Chess players at the 2006 Asian Games
Asian Games competitors for Bangladesh
St. Gregory's High School and College alumni